Patrick Starrr (born Patrick Simondac) is a Filipino-American make-up artist, and social media influencer. He launched a collection in collaboration with MAC Cosmetics in 2017, and a clothing collection in 2021.

Starrr is the host of the interview podcast Say Yas to the Guest and served as a guest judge on the reality competition series Drag Race Philippines, the prize package for which includes a one-year supply of ONE/SIZE Beauty Cosmetics from Starrr.

References

External links
 IMDb

Year of birth missing (living people)
Living people
American LGBT artists
American make-up artists
American people of Filipino descent
Filipino LGBT artists
Social media influencers